Exaerete smaragdina is a species of kleptoparasitic euglossine bees.

Description
The body shape of these bees is euceriform. Body color is metallic green. The metatibiae are three times longer than wide in both sexes. Like other "cuckoo bees", females lack a pollen-carrying apparatus.

Behavior
These solitary bees do not build nests, as they are kleptoparasites of Eulaema nigrita and Eufriesea surinamensis. Usually they wait for the host bees to leave the nest, then they lay their eggs in a completed cell. They go through five larval stages. In the second larval stage they kill the host egg. Adult males collect aromatic substances from flowers, mainly orchids. These substances are possibly used in reproduction to attract females.

Distribution
This species is present in Central and Southern America, from Mexico to Argentina.

References

smaragdina
Hymenoptera of North America
Hymenoptera of South America
Insects of Central America
Insects of Mexico
Insects described in 1845
Orchid pollinators